Zitembyak (Yetembäk) is a rural locality (a village) in Ismailovsky Selsoviet, Dyurtyulinsky District, Bashkortostan, Russia. The population was 195 as of 2010. There are 2 streets.

Geography 
Zitembyak is located 22 km northwest of Dyurtyuli (the district's administrative centre) by road. Chishma is the nearest rural locality.

References 

Rural localities in Dyurtyulinsky District